Every year since its inception, the Japanese Academy has recognized an outstanding foreign film.  The year that any given film is nominated is not based on the film's domestic release date but rather on the date it is released in Japan. As delays of over four months are not uncommon, many films are nominated in Japan the following year after their release to the Japanese market (i.e. Million Dollar Baby won the American Academy Award for Best Picture for films made in 2004, but the Japanese award, based on its localized release date, is for 2005). In fact, not one of the five films nominated for the 2007 Academy Award for Best Picture had been released in Japan by February 15, 2008, the date of the Japan Academy Prize Ceremony.

Although the 2007 recipient of this award, Letters from Iwo Jima, a film almost entirely in Japanese, would not seem to meet the qualification of a "Foreign Language Film", the actual Japanese title of the award, 最優秀外国作品賞 makes no mention of language. It would be more accurately translated as "Best Foreign Production".

Winners and nominees
2023 – Top Gun: Maverick
 Avatar: The Way of Water
 CODA
 Spider-Man: No Way Home
 RRR

2022 – No Time to Die
 Dune
 Minari
 Nomadland
 Tailor

2021 – Parasite
 Star Wars: The Rise of Skywalker
 Ford v Ferrari
 1917
 Tenet

2020 – Joker
 Yesterday
 Green Book
 The Mule
 Once Upon a Time in Hollywood

2019 – Bohemian Rhapsody
 The Greatest Showman
 The Shape of Water
 Three Billboards Outside Ebbing, Missouri
 Mission: Impossible – Fallout

2018 – La La Land
 Dunkirk
 Hidden Figures
 Beauty and the Beast
 Miss Sloane
2017 – Sully
 The Martian
 Zootopia
 Star Wars: The Force Awakens
 The Revenant
2016 – American Sniper
Kingsman: The Secret Service
Mad Max: Fury Road
Spectre
Whiplash
2015 – Frozen
Interstellar
Jersey Boys
Fury
Godzilla
2014 – Les Misérables
 3 Idiots
Captain Phillips
Django Unchained
Gravity
2013 – The Intouchables
Argo
The Dark Knight Rises
The Girl with the Dragon Tattoo
Skyfall
2012 – The King's Speech
Rise of the Planet of the Apes
Moneyball
The Social Network
Black Swan
2011 – Avatar 
Inception
Toy Story 3
Invictus
The Hurt Locker
2010 – Gran Torino 
Slumdog Millionaire
Changeling
The Wrestler
Red Cliff Part II
2009 – The Dark Knight 
The Bucket List
No Country for Old Men
Lust, Caution
Red Cliff Part I
2008 – Letters from Iwo Jima 
Dreamgirls 
Babel 
Hairspray 
The Bourne Ultimatum
2007 – Flags of Our Fathers 
Crash 
Hotel Rwanda 
Pirates of the Caribbean: Dead Man's Chest 
The Da Vinci Code
2006 – Million Dollar Baby 
Cinderella Man 
Charlie and the Chocolate Factory 
The Phantom of the Opera 
Star Wars: Episode III – Revenge of the Sith
2005 – The Last Samurai 
The Lord of the Rings: The Return of the King 
Mystic River 
Seabiscuit 
Troy
2004 – The Pianist 
Chicago
The Hours
The Lord of the Rings: The Two Towers
Yeopgijeogin geunyeo
2003 – Monster's Ball 
Gangs of New York 
Harry Potter and the Chamber of Secrets 
I Am Sam 
The Lord of the Rings: The Fellowship of the Ring
2002 – Billy Elliot 
Artificial Intelligence: AI 
Chocolat 
Harry Potter and the Philosopher's Stone 
Postmen in the Mountains
2001 – Dancer in the Dark 
American Beauty 
Gladiator 
The Green Mile 
Swiri
2000 – The Sixth Sense 
Elizabeth 
The Matrix 
Shakespeare in Love 
La Vita è bella
1999 – L.A. Confidential 
Armageddon 
As Good as It Gets 
Good Will Hunting 
Saving Private Ryan
1998 – Titanic 
The English Patient 
Shine 
Air Force One 
Seven Years in Tibet
1997 – Il Postino 
Independence Day 
Mission: Impossible 
Se7en 
12 Monkeys
1996 – The Shawshank Redemption 
Apollo 13 
The Bridges of Madison County 
Forrest Gump 
Léon
1995 – Schindler's List 
The Piano 
Pulp Fiction 
Speed 
True Lies
1994 – Jurassic Park
Cliffhanger 
The Fugitive 
Heaven & Earth
Unforgiven
1993 – JFK 
The Lover 
Basic Instinct 
The Bodyguard 
A League of Their Own
1992 – Dances with Wolves 
Awakenings 
La Femme Nikita 
The Silence of the Lambs 
Terminator 2: Judgment Day
1991 – Field of Dreams
Die Hard 2
Ghost
Cinema Paradiso
Total Recall
1990 – Die Hard
Black Rain
Indiana Jones and the Last Crusade
Major League
Rain Man
1989 – The Last Emperor
Fatal Attraction
Full Metal Jacket
Moonstruck
Wall Street
1988 – Platoon
Hannah and Her Sisters
Stand By Me
Top Gun
The Untouchables
1987 – Back to the Future
Aliens
A Chorus Line
The Color Purple
Out of Africa
1986 – Amadeus
The Cotton Club
The Killing Fields
A Passage to India
Witness
1985 – Once Upon a Time in America
Indiana Jones and the Temple of Doom
The Natural
The Right Stuff
Terms of Endearment
1984 – An Officer and a Gentleman
The Woman Next Door
Flashdance
Gandhi
Sophie's Choice
1983 – E.T. the Extra-Terrestrial
Das Boot
Chariots of Fire
On Golden Pond
Rocky III
1982 – Die Blechtrommel
Being There
The Elephant Man
Ordinary People
Les Uns et les Autres
1981 – Kramer vs. Kramer
All That Jazz
Apocalypse Now
Manhattan
Tess
1980 – The Deer Hunter
The Tree of Wooden Clogs
Big Wednesday
The Champ
The Travelling Players
1979 – Conversation Piece
Close Encounters of the Third Kind
The Goodbye Girl
Star Wars Episode IV: A New Hope
The Turning Point
1978 – Rocky
The Fire Within
Network
Slap Shot
Voyage of the Damned

References

Outstanding foreign 
Film awards for Best Foreign Language Film